Kim Sung-il (Korean: 김성일; born April 13, 1973 South Korea) is a South Korean former footballer who played as a defender.

He started professional career at FC Seoul, then known as Anyang LG Cheetahs in 1998.

Kim Sung-il was appointed as coach of Incheon United in 2015

References

External links 
 

1973 births
Living people
Association football defenders
FC Seoul players
Seongnam FC players
K League 1 players
South Korean footballers
Yonsei University alumni